Hrisostomia Iakovou (born 9 April 1971) is a Greek long-distance runner. She competed in the women's 5000 metres at the 2000 Summer Olympics.

References

1971 births
Living people
Athletes (track and field) at the 2000 Summer Olympics
Greek female long-distance runners
Olympic athletes of Greece
Place of birth missing (living people)
Mediterranean Games gold medalists for Greece
Mediterranean Games medalists in athletics
Athletes (track and field) at the 1997 Mediterranean Games
20th-century Greek women